Everett Edward "Eb" Eischeid (August 23, 1912 – November 5, 1979) was an American football and basketball coach. He served as the head football coach (1960–1968, 1976) and head basketball coach (1960–1968) at Upper Iowa University in Fayette, Iowa.

Eischeid played college football at Upper Iowa under coach John "Doc" Dorman. His son, Mike Eischeid, played professionally as a punter in the National Football League (NFL).

References

External links
 

1912 births
1979 deaths
Upper Iowa Peacocks football coaches
Upper Iowa Peacocks football players
Upper Iowa Peacocks men's basketball coaches
High school football coaches in Iowa